The O'Day 272 is an American sailboat that was designed by C. Raymond Hunt of C.R. Hunt & Associates and first built in 1985.

Production
The design was built by O'Day Corp., a division of Lear Siegler, in the United States from 1985 until 1989, but it is now out of production.

Design

The O'Day 272 is a recreational keelboat, built predominantly of fiberglass, with wood trim. It has a masthead sloop rig, a raked stem, a reverse transom, a transom-hung rudder controlled by a wheel or a tiller and an externally fastened fixed wing keel. It displaces  and carries  of ballast.

The boat is normally fitted with a small outboard motor for docking and maneuvering, although a gasoline or diesel inboard engine was a factory option.

See also
List of sailing boat types

Similar sailboats
Aloha 27
C&C 27
Cal 27
Cal 2-27
Cal 3-27
Catalina 27
Catalina 270
Catalina 275 Sport
Crown 28
CS 27
Edel 820
Express 27
Fantasia 27
Halman Horizon
Hotfoot 27
Hullmaster 27
Hunter 27
Hunter 27-2
Hunter 27-3
Irwin 27 
Island Packet 27
Mirage 27 (Perry)
Mirage 27 (Schmidt)
Orion 27-2
Tanzer 27
Watkins 27
Watkins 27P

References

External links

Keelboats
1980s sailboat type designs
Sailing yachts
Sailboat type designs by C. Raymond Hunt Associates
Sailboat types built by O'Day Corp.